Michael Warren (born 20 March 1982) is an Australian rules footballer who plays for Claremont in the West Australian Football League and once played for Fremantle in the Australian Football League.  He plays as a ruckman or key defender.

Warren, originally from South Bunbury, made his debut for Claremont in 2003.  He was then selected by Fremantle with the 41st selection in the 2004 Rookie Draft and was elevated to the senior list at the end of the 2005 AFL season.
He made his AFL debut against Melbourne at the MCG in Round 7, 2006 when injuries forced first-choice ruckmen Aaron Sandilands and Justin Longmuir to miss the game.  
He was delisted by Fremantle at the end of the 2006 AFL season without playing another game but continued to play for Claremont in the WAFL.  He was a member of Claremont's 2004, 2005 and 2007 WAFL Grand Final teams, but lost all three, twice to Subiaco and once to South Fremantle.  He switched to play for East Fremantle in 2010.

References

External links

Michael Warren WAFL Player Profile

Fremantle Football Club players
Claremont Football Club players
East Fremantle Football Club players
1982 births
Living people
Australian rules footballers from Western Australia
People from Bunbury, Western Australia
South Bunbury Football Club players